The following are the 45 municipalities of the canton of Geneva, as of 2017.

List 

Aire-la-Ville
Anières
Avully
Avusy
Bardonnex
Bellevue
Bernex
Carouge
Cartigny
Céligny
Chancy
Chêne-Bougeries
Chêne-Bourg
Choulex
Collex-Bossy
Collonge-Bellerive
Cologny
Confignon
Corsier
Dardagny
Genève
Genthod
Le Grand-Saconnex
Gy
Hermance
Jussy
Laconnex
Lancy
Meinier
Meyrin
Onex
Perly-Certoux
Plan-les-Ouates
Pregny-Chambésy
Presinge
Puplinge
Russin
Satigny
Soral
Thônex
Troinex
Vandoeuvres
Vernier
Versoix
Veyrier

References

 
Canton of Geneva
Geneva